The Haunting of Thomas Brewster is a Big Finish Productions audio drama based on the long-running British science fiction television series Doctor Who.

Plot
In Victorian London, Thomas Brewster is haunted by his dead mother, as well as the Doctor.

Cast
The Doctor — Peter Davison
Nyssa — Sarah Sutton
Robert — Christian Coulson
Mother — Leslie Ash
Thomas Brewster — John Pickard
Creek — Barry McCarthy
Pickens — Sid Mitchell
Shanks — Trevor Cooper

Cast Notes
Christian Coulson previously appeared as Pelleas in The Bride of Peladon.

External links
Big Finish Productions – The Haunting of Thomas Brewster

2008 audio plays
Fifth Doctor audio plays
Fiction set in 1851
Fiction set in 1856
Fiction set in 1861
Fiction set in 1865
Fiction set in 1867
Fiction set in 2008